Suzanne Tremblay (January 24, 1937 – September 26, 2020) was a Canadian politician from Quebec who served as a Bloc Québécois member of the House of Commons of Canada from 1993 to 2004.

Early life
Born in Montreal, Tremblay received a Queen Elizabeth II Scholarship to attend Tufts University in the United States, where she earned a Master's degree in pre-school education. She then completed a certificate in educational studies at the Université de Lyon and a certificate in child care studies at the University of London.

Political career
Tremblay was first elected to the House of Commons of Canada in the 1993 federal election for the riding of Rimouski—Témiscouata. She was re-elected in the 1997 election for the riding of Rimouski-Mitis and in the 2000 election for Rimouski-Neigette-et-La Mitis.  She announced her intention not to run again in the 2004 federal election.

She was occasionally a controversial figure, once pointing out that Quebec Premier Jean Charest's first name was really "John" in an attempt to discredit him as a representative of the true Quebec; the Bloc Québécois leader Gilles Duceppe distanced himself from this comment. Tremblay also made similar comments attacking Radio-Canada journalist Joyce Napier for not having a francophone name, and pop singer Céline Dion for purportedly turning her back on her Québécoise identity in her pursuit of pop stardom.

Following Tremblay's announcement of her retirement from the House of Commons, Louise Thibault, a municipal councillor in Le Bic, became the Bloc Québécois candidate in the new riding of Rimouski-Neigette—Témiscouata—Les Basques, and won the 2004 election. Tremblay ran in the resulting by-election to fill Thibault's municipal council seat, running primarily on a campaign of opposing the then-proposed amalgamation of Le Bic with Rimouski. She lost narrowly to Pierre Garon, a local farmer and trucker who had not previously been active in politics.

Death
Tremblay died on September 26, 2020 from cancer.

Electoral record

References

External links
 

1937 births
2020 deaths
20th-century Canadian politicians
20th-century Canadian women politicians
21st-century Canadian politicians
21st-century Canadian women politicians
Alumni of the University of London
Bloc Québécois MPs
Deaths from cancer in Quebec
French Quebecers
Members of the House of Commons of Canada from Quebec
Politicians from Montreal
Women in Quebec politics
Women members of the House of Commons of Canada